Blakemore is a surname. Notable people with the surname include:

Colin Blakemore (1944–2022), British neurobiologist specializing in vision
Dominic Blakemore (born 1969), British businessman
 Frances Blakemore (1906–1997), American-Japanese artist
Michael Blakemore, Australian actor, writer and theatre director
Stella Blakemore (1906–1991), South African author 
 Thomas Blakemore (1915–1994), American-Japanese lawyer and philanthropist
Trevor Blakemore (1879–1953), English poet and author